Slow Burn is the eleventh studio album by American country music artist  T. G. Sheppard. It was released in 1983 via Warner Bros. and Curb Records. The album includes the singles "Slow Burn", "Make My Day" and "Somewhere Down the Line." "Make My Day" was not included in the initial 1983 album release, which included the song "How Lucky We Are" instead, but the 1984 novelty song with Clint Eastwood was added with a revised release of the album in that year while "How Lucky We Are" was left off of that release, resulting in two versions of the album with slightly different track listings.

Track listing (1983)

Track listing (1984)

Chart performance

References

1983 albums
T. G. Sheppard albums
Albums produced by Jim Ed Norman
Warner Records albums
Curb Records albums